, sometimes abbreviated as , is a Japanese metalcore/deathcore band formed in Tokyo in 2009. They started to incorporate visual kei aesthetics into their appearance in 2012. As of 2020, they have dropped most of their visual kei aesthetics in favor of a more focused sound.

History 
Nocturnal Bloodlust was formed in 2009 and played their first show in Shinjuku. They gained popularity soon after and performed in music festivals such as the Bloodaxe Festival in Japan. In 2012, the band decided to incorporate more visual kei styles into their music and performances, and released a two-part single, Voices of the Apocalypse -sins- and Voices of the Apocalypse -virtues-.

In 2013, the band released their first album, GRIMOIRE, after years of only releasing EPs and singles. This was followed up by three more consecutive single releases in March, April, and May 2014 before releasing their second album, THE OMNIGOD, later that year in December.

Nocturnal Bloodlust only performed in Japan until 2016, when they held their first show abroad for the first time in Shanghai, China. Later that year they also made their debut in Europe, holding shows in the United Kingdom, France, Netherlands, Germany, and Hungary. In 2017, Nocturnal Bloodlust released a best-of album containing a selection of songs from their history, as well as new ones, before doing a short Asia tour to Hong Kong and Taiwan.

In October 2018, the guitarists Cazqui and Daichi announced their departure from the band, with their last live show scheduled for December 2018. The announcement came following their expressed disappointment in staff mishandling their band revenue.

In 2020, the band released three standalone singles: "Life is Once", "ONLY HUMAN" and "Reviver". Following these singles, the band announced the mini-album The Wasteland, which was released on December 16, in tandem with the reveal of their new guitarists Valtz (a.k.a. Meku ex-GALEYD) and Yu-taro (A Ghost of Flare).

Style 
Nocturnal Bloodlust is known for incorporating a variety of styles and different musical elements into their songs. For the three month campaign in 2014, they released three songs that showcase different styles. The first, Strike in Fact, incorporates elements of nu metal. The second release, Desperate, is an extremely dark and fast song which showcases the heavier side of the band. The third song, Libra, is a lighter song that employs elements from ballads. Other songs, such as Triangle Carnage and Providence, include funk and jazz elements as well.

As with many visual kei bands, the members frequently change their clothing and aesthetical style to fit the artistic style of their latest releases. With the inception of guitarists Valtz and Yu-taro, the band chose to drop most of their visual kei aesthetics in order to put more emphasis on music. With their current lineup, the band has opted for a more straightforward and contemporary deathcore sound often playing in very low tunings such as Drop F and Drop D#.

Members 
 Hiro - vocals (2009-present)
 Masa - bass (2009-present)
 Natsu - drums (2011-present)
 Valtz - guitars (2020-present)
 Yu-taro - guitars (2020-present)

Former members
 Junpei - guitars (2009-2011)
 Gaku Taura - drums (2009-2011)
 Cazqui - guitars (2009-2018)
 Daichi - guitars (2013-2018)
 Lin - guitars (2019)

Discography

Albums 
 Grimoire (2013)
 The Omnigod (2014)
 The Best '09–'17 (2017)
 Argos (2022)

EPs 
 Ivy (2012)
 Omega (2013)
 ZēTēS (2016)
 Whiteout (2018)
 Unleash (2019)
 The Wasteland (2020)

Singles 
 "Voices of the Apocalypse -Virtues-" (2011)
 "Voices of the Apocalypse -Sins-" (2011)
 "Bury Me" (2012)
 "Last Relapse" (2012)
 "Obligation" (2012)
 "Disaster / Unbreakable" (2013)
 "Triangle Carnage" (2013)
 "Strike in Fact" (2014)
 "Desperate" (2014)
 "Libra" (2014)
 "Providence" (2015)
 "銃創" (2015)
 "Suicide" (2017)
 "Live to Die" (2017)
 "Whiteout" (2018)
 "Life Is Once" (2020)
 "Only Human" (2020)
 "Reviver" (2020)
 "The One" (2021)

References

External links 
 Official Website
 Official YouTube Channel
 Official Facebook Page

Japanese metalcore musical groups
Deathcore musical groups
Musical groups established in 2009
Musical groups from Tokyo
Visual kei musical groups